Samuel Harrison Coon (April 15, 1903 – May 8, 1980) was a Republican member of the U.S. House of Representatives who represented the 2nd Congressional District of Oregon from 1953 to 1957.

Background
Born and raised in Boise, Idaho, Coon attended local public schools, and graduating from the University of Idaho at Moscow in 1925. He pursued various occupations in banking and agriculture, and was the owner-operator of a cattle ranch near Keating, Oregon, from 1929 to 1950. In 1937, Coon married Opal Kerfort. From 1951 to 1952 he engaged in the real estate business.

Political career
In 1950, Coon was elected to represent Baker County in the Oregon State Senate, where the Republican served only during the 1951 session of the legislature. Toward the end of his term in the state Senate, Coon successfully ran for election to Congress as a Republican from Oregon's Second District.  The two-term congressman was narrowly re-elected after a challenge from Democrat, Al Ullman, who ultimately defeated him in the election of 1956. Sam Coon served in the United States House of Representatives from January 3, 1953 to January 3, 1957.

After politics
After serving as Deputy Director for the International Cooperation Administration in Lima, Peru, from 1957 to 1959, Coon took up residence in Laguna Hills, California.  He died in 1980, and his ashes were distributed at sea.

References

1903 births
1980 deaths
People from Boise, Idaho
People from Baker County, Oregon
People from Laguna Hills, California
Republican Party Oregon state senators
University of Idaho alumni
Republican Party members of the United States House of Representatives from Oregon
Ranchers from Oregon
20th-century American politicians